Hasiba Ebrahimi (born December 21, 1996) is an Afghan actress. She is best known for her role as Marvena in A Few Cubic Meters of Love (2014) for which she earned a Crystal Simorgh for Best Actress nomination. She became the first Afghan to be nominated for Best Actress at the Fajr Film Festival. (Iran's equivalent of the Oscars).

Early life and career 
Hasiba Ebrahimi was born on December 21, 1996 in Afghanistan. She and her family were forced to migrate to Iran due to the war in Afghanistan. Hasiba's hard life began after immigrating to Iran and living in Shush, she could not attend school because she did not have an identity card and only had a passport. By registering in the Children's Support Society, she was able to study until the fifth grade. she had to attend her studies in between work. she helped with the flower-making work at home as well as studying. she continued until she finished her ninth grade, and then she could not continue her education due to moving her residence to Tehran.

Personal life 
Ebrahimi speaks Dari, Persian and English.

Filmography

Film

Awards and nominations

References

External links 
 
 Hasiba Ebrahimi at Instagram
Afghan film actresses
Afghan actresses
Living people
1996 births
21st-century Afghan actresses